Haplochromis macrognathus is a species of cichlid fish endemic to Lake Victoria in East Africa. Last seen in the early 1980s, it may now be extinct.

References

macrognathus
Fish described in 1922
Fish of Lake Victoria
Taxonomy articles created by Polbot